Analog's From Mind to Mind: Tales of Communication is the ninth in a series of anthologies of science fiction stories drawn from Analog magazine and edited by then-current Analog editor Stanley Schmidt. It was first published in paperback by Davis Publications in November 1984, with a hardcover edition following from The Dial Press in December 1984 under the alternate title From Mind to Mind: Tales of Communication from Analog.

The book collects sixteen short stories, novelettes and novellas first published in Analog and its predecessor title Astounding, together with an introduction by Schmidt.

Contents
"Introduction" (Stanley Schmidt)
"Barrier" (Anthony Boucher)
"The Signals" (Francis A. Cartier)
"The Gift of Gab" (Jack Vance)
"Top Secret" (Eric Frank Russell)
"Meihem in ce Klasrum" (Dolton Edwards)
"Omnilingual" (H. Beam Piper)
"Minds Meet" (Paul Ash)
"Two-Way Communication" (Christopher Anvil)
"Duplex" (Verge Foray)
"Sailing, Through Program Management" (Al Charmatz)
"Beam Pirate" (George O. Smith)
"From Time to Time" (Bruce Stanley Burdick)
"Shapes to Come" (Edward Wellen)
"The Piper's Son" (Lewis Padgett (Henry Kuttner and C. L. Moore))
"Babel II" (Christopher Anvil)
"Collaboration" (Mark C. Jarvis)

Notes

1984 anthologies
Science fiction anthologies
Stanley Schmidt anthologies
Davis Publications books